Purple (stylized on the cover art in its Chinese character 紫) is the second studio album by the American rock band Stone Temple Pilots, released on June 7, 1994, by Atlantic Records. The album, building on the foundation laid by the band's debut album Core,  was a huge success for the band, selling 252,000 copies in its first week and debuting at number one on the Billboard 200 chart and remaining there for three weeks, eventually selling over six million copies. It spawned a number of successful singles – "Vasoline" and "Interstate Love Song" both topped the Mainstream Rock Tracks chart and hit number 2 on the Modern Rock Tracks chart, while "Big Empty" also cracked the top ten on both charts.  Lesser known album cuts "Pretty Penny" and "Unglued" were released as promotional radio singles.

Background and musical style
In the spring of 1994, Stone Temple Pilots returned to the studio to work on their next album and completed it in less than a month. The album's first single, "Big Empty", made its debut at STP's MTV Unplugged acoustic performance in 1993. The song would later appear on the soundtrack to the 1994 Brandon Lee film The Crow, which reached number one on the Billboard charts. A couple of weeks later, Purple also reached the top of the charts, making two for the band in 1994.

The lyric "She said she'd be my woman, she said she'd be my man" from "Lounge Fly" also appears in the song "Spanish Flies" on the Mighty Joe Young Demo. Paul Leary of the Butthole Surfers is credited with playing the ending guitar solo on the song.

While Purple features elements of grunge like its predecessor, Core, the album displays the band developing a sound influenced by other genres, such as the psychedelic rock evident in "Lounge Fly" and "Silvergun Superman", the country vibes of "Interstate Love Song" and blues rock elements of "Big Empty". AllMusic's Stephen Thomas Erlewine wrote that "Purple is a quantum leap over [Core], showcasing a band hitting their stride."  Erlewine also described "Interstate Love Song" as a "concise epic as alluring as the open highway" and "Big Empty" as "a perfect encapsulation of mainstream alienation."

Artwork
The cover for the album features an animated photo of a child riding on a Qilin accompanied by a quintet of fairies above the creature and the child, taking place on a cloudy background. The album title is written as a Chinese character, zǐ (紫), on the cover, and nowhere else on the packaging (with exception of the UK and European limited edition vinyl release). Early pressings featured the Chinese character and band name printed on the CD jewel case cover itself.

No track listing appears on the back cover, which instead displays the image of a cake with the phrase "12 Gracious Melodies". A similar theme was used for the band's next studio album, Tiny Music... Songs from the Vatican Gift Shop.

On the cover of the cassette version of Purple, the child is holding the Chinese character in his hand, and it is not in the corner. There are two pressings of the actual disc in Purple CDs. One version has a close-up of the frosted flowers from the cake on the rear panel on it and another has dragon scales.

The vinyl LP release is made from colored vinyl - transparent purple in the US and UK release and a limited edition opaque marbled vinyl in a softer shade of purple available only in the UK and Europe.

On analogue formats (LP and cassette) of the original release, the album title is shown as simply Stone Temple Pilots on the tape shells and LP labels.

Reception

Purple debuted at number one in the United States upon its release on June 7, 1994. The radio-friendly "Interstate Love Song" quickly became a big hit, spending a record-setting fifteen weeks atop the album rock tracks chart. Other hits from the album included "Vasoline" and "Big Empty". By October, just four months after its release, Purple had sold three million copies.

The album received generally positive reviews, with AllMusic critic Stephen Thomas Erlewine writing that it was a "quantum leap over their debut, showcasing a band hitting its stride".

Legacy
In 2005, Purple was ranked number 438 in Rock Hard magazine's book of The 500 Greatest Rock & Metal Albums of All Time.
In 2006, the album was ranked number 73 on Guitar World magazine's list of the 100 greatest guitar albums of all time. In May 2014, Loudwire placed Purple at number six on its "10 Best Hard Rock Albums of 1994" list. In July 2014, Guitar World ranked Purple at number 24 in their "Superunknown: 50 Iconic Albums That Defined 1994" list. In 2019, Rolling Stone ranked the album at No. 24 on its list of the "50 Greatest Grunge Albums." In 2022, Pitchfork named Purple one of the 25 Best Grunge Albums of the '90s.

A 25th anniversary edition of the album was released on October 18, 2019, in several formats including a 1LP/3CD/7 inch super deluxe box set much like the deluxe version of Core released in 2017.

Track listing
All lyrics written by Scott Weiland, except where noted.

Notes
The opening of track 3, "Lounge Fly", was used as the theme for MTV News's short MTV News Break segments for several years in the mid-1990s.

Track 11, "Kitchenware & Candybars", contains a hidden track named "Second Album", which is a parody of most hidden tracks being unorthodox songs that a band wouldn't usually make. The lounge song was performed by Richard Peterson, a musician who happens to be a big fan of Johnny Mathis, hence the reference to him in the song as well as the similar cover of Olé. This track was engineered and produced by Seattle's Peter Barnes. 

STP's cover of Led Zeppelin's "Dancing Days" on the second disc of the 2019 remastered re-release first appeared on Encomium: A Tribute to Led Zeppelin, a tribute album by various artists put out by Atlantic in 1995.

Personnel
Stone Temple Pilots
Scott Weiland – lead vocals, guitar on "Silvergun Superman", percussion on "Pretty Penny"
Dean DeLeo – electric and acoustic guitars, percussion on "Pretty Penny", drum ending on  "Silvergun Superman"
Robert DeLeo – bass, guitar on "Vasoline", "Lounge Fly", "Pretty Penny", "Silvergun Superman", and "Kitchenware and Candybars", percussion on "Pretty Penny"
Eric Kretz – drums, percussion on "Vasoline", "Lounge Fly", "Pretty Penny", and "Big Empty"

Additional personnel
Brendan O'Brien – producer, recording, mixing, percussion on "Meatplow", "Interstate Love Song", "Silvergun Superman", "Army Ants" and "Kitchenware & Candybars", guitar on "Kitchenware & Candybars", mellotron on "Army Ants"
Nick DiDia – engineer
Caram Costanzo – assistant engineer
Bob Ludwig – mastering
Paul Leary – ending guitar solo on "Lounge Fly"
John Heiden – design
Dale Sizer – illustrations

Charts

Weekly charts

Year-end charts

Decade-end charts

Certifications

References

1994 albums
Albums produced by Brendan O'Brien (record producer)
Atlantic Records albums
Stone Temple Pilots albums